Kilburn to Kensal Radio or K2K Radio is a radio station based in Kilburn, London, United Kingdom. It is a partner of the Nour Festival, the Royal Borough of Kensington and Chelsea and Metroland Cultures. It was founded in 2012.

Origin 
K2K Radio began as South Kilburn's very own online community radio station, established in 2012, enabling people to attain skills and have a platform to share their voices, talents and passions with the world. Since 2012 K2K Radio have trained hundreds of presenters and hosted thousands of guests on air.

Ethics and focus 
With the right support and encouragement, anyone can run their own radio show. K2K Radio's presenters use their shows for many purposes; to promote their message, build a brand, connect with their community or simply to have fun and share music. Alongside presenters, K2K Radio have a team of studio engineers managing technical aspects and providing support to presenters in studio and remotely. K2K Radio is an entirely voluntary radio station with a global outreach with its presenters and producers being involved for their own personal love and enthusiasm for community, music and radio.

Presenters 

K2K Radio's presenters have come to the fore of modern radio from various backgrounds. Musicians, poets, luthiers, actors, comedians, journalists, producers, DJs and compères have presented on K2K Radio, each with their own presence and following.

 George Allowit
 Mickey Alsebor
 The Big Baron
 Kari Barth
 Wayne Boucaud
 Stan Brousil
 Robin Catto
 Tyrone Coogan
 Patrick Cole
 Simon Coulson
 Chawat Django
 Emiliyah
 Bukky Fadipe 
 Saul Galpern
 Joris Gillet
 Zoë Huxford
 Gino Jaali
 Kiasi Sandrine Mputu
 DJ Lebbz
 Bella Lisa
 Angelika Miller
 John Morgan
 Sara Nemcekova
 Talia C. Pittman
 Maha Rahwanji
 Dan Raza
 Simon Stevens
 Rory Windass
 Marianna Zappi

Past presenters 

 Carol
 Jo Dusepo

Shows 

 Alternative Wonderland
 Angelika's Indie Live Sessions
 Black in 3D
 Cosmic American Music
 Eclectic Grooves
 HD Music
 Hedonica
 Hillhead to Harlesden
 Housemates
 K2Klassical
 L.O.U.D.
 Maha's Music
 MCG
 Nektar Island
 Odds 'n' Evens
 Old, New, Borrowed & Blue
 Pop Muzik
 Reggae Heaven
 Spirit & Roots
 The Baron's Big Show
 The Coming Up Show
 The George Allowit Show
 The John Morgan Show
 The Rock-a-Rory Show
 Unapologetically Me

References

Radio stations in London
Internet radio stations in the United Kingdom